Duke of Valentinois is a title of nobility, originally in the French peerage. It is currently one of the many hereditary titles claimed by the Prince of Monaco despite its extinction in French law in 1949. Though it originally indicated administrative control of the Duchy of Valentinois, based around the city of Valence, the duchy has since become part of France, making the title simply one of courtesy.

It has been created at least four times: on August 17, 1498, for Cesare Borgia, in 1548 for Diane of Poitiers, in 1642 for Prince Honoré II of Monaco, and most recently in 1715 for Prince Jacques I of Monaco.

Counts of Valentinois

First creation
King Louis XII of France and Naples created Cesare Borgia Duke of Valentinois in 1498. Both the Italianized form of this title and his previous appointment as Cardinal of Valencia led to his commonly used nickname: "Il Valentino". After Cesare's death, his daughter Louise Borgia (15001553) did not become Duchess suo jure due to the male-only succession of the title, but was instead styled "Dame Valentinois", titular Duchess of Romagna and Countess of Diois.

Second creation
King Henry II of France created his mistress Diane de Poitiers Duchess of Valentinois in 1548. She was the only suo jure Duchess and her title was destinated to end after her death, due to the Salic law commonly used among French nobility.

Third creation
King Louis XIII of France created the title by letters patent, signed in May 1642 and registered on 18 July 1642, as a conglomeration of several estates in the French province of Dauphiné which he had previously given to Honoré II, Prince of Monaco.

The first person to hold the title was Honoré II, Prince of Monaco, reigning Prince at the time of its creation; on his death it passed to his grandson Louis I, and thence to Louis's son Antoine. However, since the title's inheritance was restricted to male heirs, and because Antoine had only daughters and no sons, it was due to pass his brother, François-Honoré Grimaldi, but became extinct on 22 July 1715 when François-Honoré forfeited his right to succeed Antoine.

Fourth creation
On 20 October 1715, Antoine's eldest daughter and heiress Louise-Hippolyte married Jacques-François de Goyon-Matignon, who had signed a contract on 5 September 1715 by which he was obliged to take the surname Grimaldi. King Louis XV of France thereupon recreated the title of Valentinois by letters patent, signed in December 1715 and registered on 2 September 1716, for Jacques, who was to succeed his father-in-law Antoine as Prince Jacques I; like the previous creation, its inheritance was restricted to male heirs.

After Jacques's abdication in 1733, the title passed uninterrupted for several generations from Prince to Prince: from Jacques to Honoré III, Honoré IV, Honoré V, Florestan I, Charles III, Albert I. Albert bestowed the title of Duchess of Valentinois upon his adopted granddaughter Charlotte, thenceforth known as Princess Charlotte, Duchess of Valentinois, on 20 May 1919. On 20 March 1920, shortly after Charlotte's marriage to Pierre de Polignac, he, like Jacques-François de Goyon-Matignon, took the title of Duke of Valentinois, having already changed his surname to Grimaldi.

Although Albert I had granted the title of Valentinois to his granddaughter Charlotte, its right to succession remained with Louis II and his legitimate male descendants; consequently, on his death without a male heir in 1949, it became extinct in French law and under Salic Law. However, his successor, Rainier III (son of Charlotte), still claimed it, possibly in the belief, as suggested by François Velde, that it was "implicitly recreated for Charlotte by the French Republic in 1919 when her adoption was approved". However, the various French Republics have never created nor re-created any dukedom.

According to the Almanach de Gotha, the title used in Monaco corresponds to a Monegasque concession of a title which otherwise would not be recognized in France, specially having in account that when Charlotte was created Duchess by her father, her grandfather was still the living Prince of Monaco with the right to the title of Duke, and only his son could succeed to the French title. Beside, only legitimate children can inherit French titles.

 Princess Charlotte (1919–1977)
 Rainier III (15 November 1977–6 April 2005)
 Albert II (6 April 2005–Present)

References

See also 
 List of French dukedoms

Monegasque titles